Madness is  is a 1994 Italian giallo film directed by Bruno Mattei. The film is about Giovanna Dei (Monica Carpanese) who is the creator of the comic series Doctor Dark, a character with a split personality. After a series of murders begin to happen in similar fashion to how Doctor Dark's fictional murders. Dei defends herself against any criticism of the violence in her comics and later finds that the murderer is leaving the eyeballs of her victims in her apartment.

Madness was a low budget production shot for foreign audiences. The version released to home video in Italy differs from the original film market screenings, where it borrows murder scenes from A Blade in the Dark. Only the English dubbed version was released internationally under the title Madness, it was released in Italy as Gli occhi dentro. Film historians Roberto Curti and Troy Howarth commented on the film negatively on their retrospective reviews of the film.

Cast
 Monica Carpanese as Giovanna Dei
 Gabriele Gori as Nico Manelli
 Emy Valentino as Emy
 Antonio Zequila as Amedeo Callistrati
 Achille Brugnini as Marzio Mannino
 Fausto Lombardi as Lorenzo Calligari

Production
As with the films director Bruno Mattei made in the early 1990s, Madness was a low-budget effort aimed primarily at foreign sales. Screenplay author Lorenzo De Luca stated the scenario and script were written in one week and that Mattei "left me plenty of room to do what I wanted, as long as the movie did not cost too much and there were not too many characters. I had lots of fun, although being a low-budget film I was paid very little."

Madness was shot with the same film crew who had previously shot Mattei's erotic thriller Dangerous Attraction. The film's music is credited to Flipper music, which is library music as well as borrowing from film scores of films like Lady Frankenstein.

Release
Madness was released in 1994 as Gli occhi dentro. The version released to home video in Italy had large portions of the film re-edited from its original screenings at film markets. This included taking two murder scenes from Lamberto Bava's film A Blade in the Dark (1983) which replace two murder scenes shot by Mattei. This version also loses scenes where a character finds the murder victims' eyes in an apartment and the epilogue with a coast guard boat approaching a yacht. The English-dubbed video was released internationally as Madness.

Reception
From retrospective reviews, Troy Howarth in his book on Italian giallo films opined that Madnesss screenplay by  "contains seeds of promise, but the film is so poorly made and acted that it ends up making no impression whatsoever". Howarth also commented on the slow pacing, cinematography that was "flat and ugly", and actors who "overact like mad or are so wooden that they seem to disappear into the scenery."

References

Footnotes

Sources

External links

1994 films
1990s Italian films
Films directed by Bruno Mattei
Giallo films
Films about comics
1990s Italian-language films